Hal Nerdal (born 22 September 1927) is an Australian former skier who competed at the 1960 Winter Olympics. He came 31st and last in the Nordic combined event. It was the only time Australia has ever participated in the event at the Olympics.

References

 

Australian male Nordic combined skiers
Olympic Nordic combined skiers of Australia
Nordic combined skiers at the 1960 Winter Olympics
1927 births
Living people
Norwegian emigrants to Australia